Suillellus hypocarycinus is a species of bolete fungus found in North America. Originally described as a species of Boletus by Rolf Singer in 1945, it was transferred to Suillellus by William Alphonso Murrill in 1948.

References

External links

hypocarycinus
Fungi described in 1945
Fungi of the United States
Fungi without expected TNC conservation status